American Wake is the first full-length solo album by Patrick Clifford, released in 2010.

The title refers to a gathering  in an Irish home the night before a family member emigrated to America, in which friends and family would say goodbye to the emigrant for what was probably the last time.

The album's production marks a significant change from Clifford's work as a member of Four to the Bar. While the repertoire is largely drawn from Irish folk music, the arrangement and production rely less on traditional Irish instruments (such as fiddle, tin whistle, and flute), and more on instrumentation from the American folk music idiom (such as harmonica, piano, and organ).

The cover artwork features an image of Clifford as a child with family
members, on a boat approaching the Statue of Liberty.

Content

"The Narrowback," "Paddy Yank's Blues," and "The Golden Door" are a suite of related original compositions that comprise a framework for the album. The same melodic theme appears in each, though in different keys and arrangements.

"Sea-Fever" is a setting of John Masefield's poem by that name.

"Jig to Joy" is a version of "Ode to Joy," from Beethoven's Ninth Symphony, performed in a time signature of 6/8, or "jig time."

"The Shores of Botany Bay," "The Shores of Amerikay," "Mary from Dungloe," "The Leaving of Liverpool," and "Spancil Hill" are all traditional folk songs about emigrating from Ireland to America. "Thousands Are Sailing," another emigration song, is a contemplative arrangement of the Pogues song by that name.

The collector's edition of the album, released simultaneously with the standard edition, also includes "The Irish Rover."

Track listing

All tracks traditional; arr. Clifford, except as noted.

"The Narrowback" (Clifford)
"The Shores of Botany Bay"
"The Shores of Amerikay"
"Sea-Fever" (Music: Clifford; words: John Masefield)
"Mary from Dungloe"
"Paddy Yank's Blues (Clifford)"
"The Galway Races"
"The Leaving of Liverpool"
"Jig to Joy"
"Spancil Hill"
"Thousands Are Sailing" (Philip Thomas Ryan)
"The Golden Door" (Clifford)
"The Irish Rover" (Collector's Edition only)

References

External links
American Wake liner notes

2010 debut albums
Patrick Clifford (musician) albums